Kotis Point (Nos Kotis \'nos 'ko-tis\) is a point on the northwest coast of Varna Peninsula on Livingston Island in the South Shetland Islands, Antarctica forming the south side of the entrance to Eliseyna Cove.  The point is featuring a conspicuous rock at its tip, situated 3 km northeast of Bezmer Point, 6.6 km southwest of Williams Point and 12.6 km east-northeast of Siddins Point.  It was named after the Thracian King Kotis I, 384-359 BC.

Location

Maps
 L.L. Ivanov et al. Antarctica: Livingston Island and Greenwich Island, South Shetland Islands. Scale 1:100000 topographic map. Sofia: Antarctic Place-names Commission of Bulgaria, 2005.
 L.L. Ivanov. Antarctica: Livingston Island and Greenwich, Robert, Snow and Smith Islands. Scale 1:120000 topographic map.  Troyan: Manfred Wörner Foundation, 2009.

References
 Kotis Point. SCAR Composite Antarctic Gazetteer
 Bulgarian Antarctic Gazetteer. Antarctic Place-names Commission. (details in Bulgarian, basic data in English)

External links
 Kotis Point. Copernix satellite image

Headlands of Livingston Island